The Gold Line is a rapid transit line in the MARTA rail system. It operates between Doraville and Airport stations, running through Doraville, Chamblee, Brookhaven, Atlanta, East Point and College Park.

The Gold Line was previously called the Northeast-South Line until MARTA switched to a color-based naming system in October 2009. The North-South Line, from its launch, was considered one line, denoted with an orange color on old system maps until 2006 when the North Branch and the Northeast branch were redesignated as the North-South Line (the current Red Line) and the Northeast-South Line (the current Gold Line). Technically, with the 2009 designation change, there is no longer a mention of the color orange for the line.  Using the Five Points station as a reference point, the Northeast Line was designated for trips headed to Doraville, and the South Line was designated for trips headed to the Airport.

The rail line was part of the initial MARTA north–south rail service in 1981.  The first segment ran from the Garnett to the North Avenue stations, although the Peachtree Center opened the year after as an infill.  In 1982, it expanded north to Arts Center, and in 1984, expanded as far north as Brookhaven and as far south as Lakewood/Fort McPherson.  The East Point station opened, extending the line two miles to the south.  A little more than a year later, the Chamblee station began service and served as the temporary terminus of the North Line.  In 1988, the Airport station opened, and became the terminus of the South Line.  In 1992, the North-South Line was extended northward to its current terminus at Doraville.  In 1996, MARTA extended North Line services to Dunwoody.  This created two branches of the North Line, and the Doraville branch was redesignated as the Northeast Line to avoid confusion.  It finally extended north to its current terminus at North Springs in 2000.

Now known as the Gold Line, it shares trackage with its counterpart, the Red Line, between Airport and just north of the Lindbergh Center.

Line description
The Gold Line runs above ground, at-grade and below ground in various portions of its route.  It begins at the northeastern terminus, Doraville station in Doraville.  The nonrevenue tracks extend northeastward from the station north of I-285.  It then goes southwestward paralleling Peachtree Road in DeKalb County.  Upon entering Atlanta in Buckhead, it crosses over the Red Line in the median of GA 400 before joining the Red Line, going southwest paralleling I-85.  It turns south through Midtown and enters downtown Atlanta, where it meets the Blue and Green Lines at Five Points station.  Leaving downtown, the Gold Line continues south, paralleling Lee Street and Main Street into East Point and College Park before reaching its terminus at the Airport station.

Naming controversy
When the color-based name change was proposed, it was the Yellow Line at first. However, in February 2010, the name was revised to Gold in order to address a concern among the Asian-American residents along the rail corridor. The section of the Gold Line that is not shared by the Red Line has a significant number of Asian-American residents, to whom the term "yellow" is considered derogatory.  Despite the color name change, interestingly many MARTA system maps denoted the Gold Line with the yellow color still until 2017.

Stations
listed from northeast to south

Note:  The east–west (now Blue/Green Line) platform opened in 1979.

References

External links

 Gold Line overview
 Gold Line schedule

 
Atlanta
Railway lines opened in 1981